Warheads on Foreheads is a compilation album by American thrash metal band Megadeth, released on March 22, 2019 through Capitol Records. The album was created as a celebration of the band's 35th anniversary and compiles 35 songs personally chosen by Dave Mustaine from throughout the band's career.

Background
Mustaine selected and compiled 35 tracks, choosing at least one track from each of the band's fifteen studio albums. He stated, "I see these songs as the most efficient weapons in the band's arsenal...These tracks were created for maximum destruction."

The album was released as 3-CD and 4-LP vinyl editions, as well as a 4-LP vinyl edition on silver-colored vinyl. Both versions feature the same track listing.

Critical reception
Warheads on Foreheads was generally well received by critics. In a review for AllMusic, Fred Thomas writes that Warheads on Foreheads feels "more like an anthology than a greatest-hits collection", showing resilience and consistency throughout critically successful and fan-favorite albums alike.

Track listing 
Adapted from CD metadata.

Personnel
Megadeth
Dave Mustaine - guitars, lead vocals (all tracks)
Kiko Loureiro - guitars (tracks 33-35)
David Ellefson - bass, backing vocals (tracks 1-26, 30-35)

Megadeth alumni
Chris Poland - guitars (tracks 1-7, 27)
Jeff Young - guitars (tracks 8 and 9)
Marty Friedman - guitars (tracks 10-25)
Gar Samuelson - drums (tracks 1-7)
Chuck Behler - drums (tracks 8 and 9)
Nick Menza - drums (tracks 10-22)
James LoMenzo - bass (tracks 28 and 29)
Shawn Drover - drums (tracks 28-31)
Glen Drover - guitars (track 28)
Chris Broderick - guitars (track 29-31)

Session musicians
Jimmie Lee Sloas - bass (track 27)
Vinnie Colaiuta - drums (track 27)
Chris Adler - drums (tracks 33-35)

Charts

References

2019 compilation albums
Megadeth compilation albums
Capitol Records compilation albums